Besri or Basri or Basari may refer to:
Basri, Bushehr
Besri, Lorestan
Besri, Markazi
Basri, West Azerbaijan